Kasanaq (also Romanized as Kasānaq; also known as Kasalan, Kāsānā, and Kaslān) is a village in Azghan Rural District, in the Central District of Ahar County, East Azerbaijan Province, Iran. At the 2006 census, its population was 532, in 121 families.

References 

Populated places in Ahar County